This is an overview of the progression of the world track cycling record of the men's 4 km team pursuit as recognised by the Union Cycliste Internationale.

Progression

Amateurs (1986–1989)

Open (1993–)

References

Track cycling world record progressions